Sørstranda or Sørstrand may refer to:

Sørstranda, Etne, a village in Etne municipality, Vestland county, Norway
Sørstrand, Innlandet, a village in Ringebu municipality, Innlandet county, Norway
Sørstranda, Vestland, a village in Gloppen municipality, Vestland county, Norway